Kuvansi is a medium-sized lake of Finland in the Vuoksi main catchment area. It is located in the Northern Savonia region and in the municipality of Suonenjoki.

See also
List of lakes in Finland

References

North Savo
Lakes of Leppävirta